The Electoral Commission's Register of Political Parties lists the details of political parties registered to fight elections in the United Kingdom, including their registered name. Under current electoral law, including the Registration of Political Parties Act 1998, the Electoral Administration Act 2006, and the Political Parties, Elections and Referendums Act 2000, only registered party names can be used on ballot papers by those wishing to fight elections. Candidates who do not belong to a registered party can use "independent" or no label at all. , the Electoral Commission showed the number of registered political parties in Great Britain and Northern Ireland as 408.

Before the middle of the 19th century, politics in the United Kingdom was dominated by the Whigs and the Tories. These were not political parties in the modern sense but somewhat loose alliances of interests and individuals. The Whigs included many of the leading aristocratic dynasties committed to the Protestant succession, and later drew support from elements of the emerging industrial interests and wealthy merchants, while the Tories were associated with the landed gentry, the Church of England and the Church of Scotland.

By the mid 19th century, the Tories had evolved into the Conservative Party, and the Whigs had evolved into the Liberal Party. The concept of right and left came originally from France, where the supporters of a monarchy (constitutional or absolute) sat on the right wing of the National Assembly, and republicans on the left. In the late 19th century, the Liberal Party began to lean towards the left. Liberal Unionists split off from the Liberals over Irish Home Rule and moved closer to the Conservatives over time.

The Liberals and Conservatives dominated the political scene until the 1920s, when the Liberal Party declined in popularity and suffered a long stream of resignations. It was replaced as the main anti-Tory opposition party by the newly emerging Labour Party, which represented an alliance between the labour movement, organised trades unions and various socialist societies.

Since then, the Conservative and Labour parties have dominated British politics, and have alternated in government ever since. However, the UK is not quite a two-party system as other parties have significant support. The Liberal Democrats were the third largest party until the 2015 general election when they were overtaken by the Scottish National Party in terms of seats and UK political party membership, and by the UK Independence Party (UKIP) in terms of votes.

The UK's first-past-the-post electoral system leaves small parties disadvantaged on a UK-wide scale. It can, however, allow parties with concentrations of supporters in the constituent countries to flourish. In the 2015 election, there was widespread controversy when the UK Independence Party (UKIP) and the Green Party of England and Wales received 4.9 million votes (12.6% of the total vote for UKIP and 3.8% for the Greens) yet only gained one seat each in the House of Commons. After that election, UKIP, the Liberal Democrats, the Scottish National Party, Plaid Cymru, and the Green Party of England and Wales, together with its Scottish and Northern Ireland affiliated parties, delivered a petition signed by 477,000 people to Downing Street demanding electoral reform.

Since 1997, proportional representation-based voting systems have been adopted for elections to the Scottish Parliament, the Senedd (Welsh Parliament), the Northern Ireland Assembly, the London Assembly and (until Brexit in 2020) the UK's seats in the European Parliament. In these bodies, other parties have had success.

Traditionally political parties have been private organisations with no official recognition by the state. The Registration of Political Parties Act 1998 changed that by creating a register of parties.

Membership of political parties has been in decline in the UK since the 1950s, falling by over 65% from 1983 (4% of the electorate) to 2005 (1.3%).

House of Commons Parliamentary parties

Parties without representation in the House of Commons, but with representation in other UK legislatures

There are a number of political parties in the United Kingdom that do not have representation in the House of Commons, but have elected representatives in the Northern Ireland Assembly and Scottish Parliament These are:

Party descriptions

Local government

Nationwide

Nationalist and regionalist

Local

No elected UK representation

This is a table of notable minor parties. Many parties are registered with the Electoral Commission but do not qualify for this list as they have not received significant independent coverage. Parties active across Ireland may have representation in the Republic of Ireland but not Northern Ireland.

Defunct parties

Historical parties

See also
 Timeline of political parties in the United Kingdom
 List of political parties in the United Kingdom by representation
 List of political parties in the United Kingdom opposed to austerity
 Political make-up of local councils in the United Kingdom
 List of political parties by country
 Politics of the United Kingdom
 Political party affiliation in the United Kingdom
 Elections in the United Kingdom
 List of political parties in Northern Ireland
 List of political parties in Scotland
 List of political parties in Wales
 List of political parties in the Isle of Man (a British Crown dependency)
 List of political parties in Gibraltar (a British overseas territory)
 Index of UK party meta attributes

Notes

References

External links
 
 
 Electoral Commission: Database of Registers, includes Register of Political Parties
 Links to UK political websites from the BBC
 NSD: European Election Database – UK descriptions of main parties

United Kingdom
 
Political parties